Nicholas John Walne (born 18 September 1975) is a former Wales international rugby union player. He was selected for the 1999 Rugby World Cup squad. Walne usually played on the wing but sometimes at centre. He played his club rugby for Cardiff. Walne was raised in the Monmouthshire village of Llangybi and educated at Caerleon Comprehensive School.

Notes

1975 births
Living people
Cardiff RFC players
People educated at Caerleon Comprehensive School
Rugby union players from Scunthorpe
Rugby union wings
Wales international rugby union players
Welsh rugby union players
Richmond F.C. players